Larkin's Hundred, also known as The Castle, is a historic home at Harwood, Anne Arundel County, Maryland, United States. It is a two-story brick house. Although tradition holds that it was built in 1704 by Thomas Larkin, a son of John Larkin of nearby Larkin's Hill Farm, evidence suggest it was actually constructed in the second quarter of the 18th century for Captain Joseph Cowman, a mariner and wealthy Quaker. A white clapboard kitchen wing at the west end was added in 1870. A noteworthy interior feature is a graceful stairway of American walnut.

Larkin's Hundred was listed on the National Register of Historic Places in 1969.

References

External links
, including photo from 1996, at Maryland Historical Trust

Colonial architecture in Maryland
Georgian architecture in Maryland
Houses on the National Register of Historic Places in Maryland
Houses in Anne Arundel County, Maryland
Houses completed in 1704
Historic American Buildings Survey in Maryland
National Register of Historic Places in Anne Arundel County, Maryland
1704 establishments in Maryland